Gulan-e Sofla (also Romanized as Gūlān-e Soflá; also known as Gūlān-e Pā'īn) is a village in Baryaji Rural District, in the Central District of Sardasht County, West Azerbaijan Province, Iran. At the 2006 census, its population was 98, in 23 families.

References 

Populated places in Sardasht County